Malherbe is a surname of French origin. It is common in South Africa due to the immigration of Huguenots in the late 17th century. 

Notable people with the surname include:

de Malherbe family from Normandy, France
 François de Malherbe (1555-1628), French poet, reformer of French language
  (1600-1627), duellist, son of the poet François de Malherbe
  (1712-1771), archbishop of Tours
  (1911-1983), author in political and economic sciences

de Malherbe family from Maine, France
  (1826-1891), French politician, senator
  (1894-1966), recognised "Righteous Among the Nations"
  (born 1958), French painter
 Apolline de Malherbe (born 1980), television journalist

Malherbe family from South Africa
 Daniël Francois Malherbe (1881-1969), South-African Afrikaans-language novelist, poet, dramatist and scholar
 Arnaud Malherbe (born 1972), South-African athlete, 400 meters runner
 Frans Malherbe (born 1991), South-African international rugby union player
 Stephanie Malherbe (born 1996), South-African international football player

Malherbe families from Belgium
  (1950-2015), Belgian philosopher and writer
 André Malherbe (1956–2022), Belgian Grand Prix motocross racer
 Anne Malherbe Gosselin (born 1968), Belgian spouse of Rafael Correa, president of Ecuador from 2007 to 2017

Others
 Alfred Malherbe (1804–1865), French magistrate and naturalist
 Annet Malherbe (born 1957), Dutch actress
  (born 1972), French script writer and director
 Charles Théodore Malherbe (1853-1911), French violinist, musicologist, music editor and composer
  (born 1973), French writer and play director
 Didier Malherbe (born 1943), French rock and jazz saxophonist
  (1870-1963), French composer
 Guy Malherbe (born 1946), French politician, mayor and member of the National Assembly
 Henri de Malherbe (fl. 1910–1932), French international rugby union player (list of selections) and chairman of SC Mazamet
 Henry Malherbe (1886–1958), journalist and French writer, winner of the Prix Goncourt in 1917
 Hermeline Malherbe (born 1969), French politician, senator
  (c. 1740–1780), French writer
  (1750-1842), French revolutionary and theater director
  (1758-1841), French politician and magistrate
  (born 1930), French civil engineer and encyclopedist
  (born 1941), French philosopher
 Óscar Malherbe de León (born 1964), Mexican drug lord
 Pierre-Olivier Malherbe (ca. 1569 - ca. 1616), French explorer
 Suzanne Malherbe (1892–1972), French illustrator and photographer

See also
 Malherbe (disambiguation)

References

French-language surnames
Afrikaans-language surnames